National historic site may refer to:

National Historic Sites of Canada
National Historic Sites (United States)

See also
Historic site
List of heritage registers